Deep Six is an English phrase of likely nautical origins, most commonly used as a verb meaning: "To discard, get rid of, or cancel; to completely put an end to something."

The term may also refer to:

Audio
 Deep Six, a 1984 six-part BBC Radio 4 spy thriller written by John Fletcher about an ex-SAS agent framed for murder and on the run.

Books and comics
 Deep Six (comics), a set-index article listing several uses, including:
 Deep Six (Marvel Comics), two different Marvel Comics teams
 Deep Six (DC Comics), a 1971 DC Comics supervillain team
 Deep Six (G.I. Joe), a fictional character in the G.I. Joe universe
 Deep Six (novel), a 1984 Dirk Pitt novel by Clive Cussler
 The Deep Six (novel), a 1953 novel by Martin Dibner; basis for the 1958 film (see below)
 Deepsix, a 2000 science fiction novel by Jack McDevitt

Film and television
 The Deep Six, a 1958 World War II war film directed by Rudolph Maté
 Deep Six (Teen Titans), a television episode
 DeepStar Six, a 1986 American horror/scifi film based in an underwater military research facility

Music
 The Deep Six (band), a 1960s American pop/rock band
 Deep Six (album), a compilation of Seattle alternative rock bands, 1986
 "Deep Six" (song), by Marilyn Manson, 2014
 "Deep Six", a song by Big Black from Racer-X, 1994
 "Deep Six", a song by Matthew Good Band from Underdogs, 1997

Other uses
 Deep Six (Alberta politics), a group of Progressive Conservative members of the Legislative Assembly of Alberta, elected in the 1993 provincial election
 Deep Six, a move used by the professional wrestler Baron Corbin

See also 
 DeepStar Six, 1989 film